Jacob Vrel (fl. (c.1630–c.1680) was a Dutch, Flemish, or Westphalian painter of interiors and urban street scenes during the Dutch Golden Age (1588–1672). He was active from 1654 to 1662.

Biography
Jacob Vrel is also referred to as Jan instead of Jacob(us); alternative spellings of his surname are Frel, Frelle, Vreele, Vrelle, and Vriel. 
Though Vrel's birthplace is unknown, scholars consider him a Dutch artist. 

Despite the many architectural elements, bread products or clothing of the figures in his paintings, art historians are unable to assign most of Vrel's street scenes to any particular city or region. Vrel is thought to have composed them mostly from imagination.  As of 2021, two experts have recognized streets and buildings of the Dutch city of Zwolle, not far from the German border in three pictures.

Style
According to the Netherlands Institute for Art History (Dutch RKD-Nederlands Instituut voor Kunstgeschiedenis), Vrel was a member of the same "school" or artistic style as Pieter de Hooch, showing simple intimate scenes of daily life in towns, often including studies in perspective. Though no evidence for a specific "school" exists, the center of influence seems to have been in the artistic centers of Haarlem and Delft, for artists born during the years 1620–1630. The painters listed by the RKD in this category are Esaias Boursse, Hendrick van der Burgh, Pieter de Hooch, Pieter Janssens Elinga, Cornelis de Man, Hendrick ten Oever, and Jacob Vrel.

Vrel's works are sometimes confused with those by Esaias Boursse or Pieter de Hooch.
Vrel often painted his signature on a strip of paper or cloth in his painting, reminiscent of medieval banners or scrolls.

Work 
Thirty-eight to forty paintings have been attributed to Vrel. 

The following public collections hold Vrel´s work in their permanent collections:
Alte Pinakothek, Munich: Street Scene with Figures in Conversation 
Ashmolean Museum, Oxford: The Little Nurse
Detroit Institute of Arts, Detroit: Interior
Groninger Museum, Groningen: Interior with a Man by a Fireplace
Hermitage Museum, Saint Petersburg: Street Scene
Heylshof Museum, Worms: Two Cottage Women Conversing
Kunstthalle Hamburg: Street Corner
Kunsthistorisches Museum, Vienna: Woman at a Window
Museum de Fundatie, Zwolle: Interior with a Busy Woman, 1650.
National Gallery of Art, Washington: Young Woman in an Interior, ca. 1660.
Palais des Beaux-Arts de Lille: The Weaver's Workshop
Philadelphia Museum of Art, Philadelphia: Street Scene, mid-17th century
Rijksmuseum, Amsterdam: Alleyway in a Dutch Town; Woman in Front of a Stove
Royal Museum of Fine Arts, Antwerp: The Little Sick Nurse
Royal Museums of Fine Arts, Brussels: Interior with a Woman and a Child
San Diego Museum of Art, San Diego: The Little Sick Nurse
Thyssen-Bornemisza Museum, Madrid: Interior with Woman Seated by a Hearth
Wallraf–Richartz Museum, Cologne: Interior with an Old Woman

A retrospective exhibition curated by Berndt Ebert of the Alte Pinakothek was to open in late 2020, followed by the catalogue raisonné by Ebert, Cécile Tainturier and Quentin Buvelot.in 2021. The monographic exhibition on Vrel was rescheduled to be shown in 2023 at the Fondation Custodia in Paris and the Mauritshuis in The Hague.

References

Bibliography 

 Théophile Thoré. "Van der Meer de Delft." Gazette des beaux-arts [suppl. is Chron. A.] 21 (1866): 458–470.
 Clotilde Brière-Misme. "Un 'Intimiste' hollandais: Jacob Vrel." Revue de l’art ancien et moderne 68 (1935): 97–114, 157–172.
 Gérard Regnier. "Jacob Vrel, un Vermeer du pauvre." Gazette des beaux-arts [suppl. is Chron. A.] n.s. 6, 71 (1968): 269–282.
 Peter Sutton, ed. Masters of Seventeenth-Century Dutch Genre Painting (exh. cat. Philadelphia Museum of Art; Gemäldegalerie, Berlin; Royal Academy, London, 1984): 352–354.
 Elizabeth Honig: "Looking in(to) Jacob Vrel." Yale Journal of Criticism 3, no. 1 (Fall, 1989): 37–56.

External links 

Jacob Vrel on Artnet

Year of birth unknown
Year of death unknown
Dutch Golden Age painters
Dutch male painters
Dutch genre painters
Artists from Haarlem
Artists from Delft
Year of birth uncertain